This table displays the top-rated primetime television series of the 1987–88 season as measured by Nielsen Media Research.

References

1987 in American television
1988 in American television
1987-related lists
1988-related lists
Lists of American television series